Kurd Qaburstan, is an ancient Near East archaeological site in Erbil Governorate, in the Kurdistan Region of Iraq , It is considered one of the most important  The archaeological hills in Erbil  22 kilometers southwest of Erbil. It lies halfway between the Upper and Lower Zab rivers. The modern village of Yedi Kizlar covers to southeastern part of the lower town. The site dates back to the late 3rd millennium BC but was primarily occupied during the first half of the 2nd millennium, in the Old Babylonian and Mitanni periods. It has been suggested as the site of the ancient city of Qabra. Nearby promising excavations are at Tell Baqrta and Qasr Shemamok (Kilizi).

Archaeology
A regional survey by the Erbil Plain Archaeological Survey led by Jason Ur of the Harvard University identified the location (Site 31, Kurd Qaburstan, UTM 397479 E/3983250 N) from satellite imagery and examination of the site. From the 1960's CORONA image it appeared to be a large walled city. The 11 hectare central mound (with a modern cemetery at its highest point) is 17 meters in height with a lower town rising about 3 meters above the plain. The site has an area of around 118 hectares and the surrounding city wall (encompassing 105 hectares) is preserved to the height of between 1 and 3 meters and had bastions every 20 meters.

Excavation field seasons by a Johns Hopkins University team led by Glenn Schwartz and  Andrew Creekmore have been held in 2013, 2014, 2017, and 2022 (with a study season in 2016). In 2013 a geophysical survey was begun and seven small (6 x 10 meters) sample sections were opened. Mitanni era remains were found on the upper mound and middle Islamic remains in the lower town and the city wall was confirmed. In 2014, the geophysical survey was continued (totaling 30 hectares by seasons end) augmented by surface sherd collection. Five trenches on the upper mound found three phases of Mitanni occupation including a cylinder seal. A trench in the lower town found Middle Bronze residential occupation. A trench on the south slope of the upper mound found two Middle Bronze phases with the lower firmly Old Babylonian period. A Neo-Babylonian era grave (with "stamp seals, a cylinder seal, bronze toggle pins, and a bronze fibula") was also excavated there. In 2017, continued work in the lower town showed that the Middle Bronze construction was bedded on virgin soil at a depth of 3 meters showing that the lower town was first occupied then. Continued geophysical work located a monumental Middle Bronze temple in the lower town which was confirmed by test excavation. In 2022 a 19 x 4 meter trench was excavated on the high mound north slope on a large Middle Bronze building showing signs of having been burnt. Three 10 meter by 10 meter trenches were begun in the eastern lower town. Continued magnetometry showed a large structure in the northern lower town, possible a palace.

History
The upper mound of Kurd Qaburstan was first occupied early in the 3rd millennium BC. Occupation spread to the lower town early in the 2nd millennium BC (Middle Bronze Age) and the city reached its maximum extent during the Old Babylonian period and into the Mitanni period (Late Bronze Age). Afterward, occupation was very light and restricted to the upper mound through the Sassanian period.

Qabra
It has been proposed that the site is the location of Qabra, known from Old Babylonian period texts. Qabra is not recorded before or after and it is assumed that it was known by that name for only a short time. It is known that Qabra, and its king Bunu-Eshtar, were attacked by a coalition of Ekallatum, under Shamshi-Adad I and Eshnunna, under Dadusha (c. 1862 to 1818 BC) and then occupied by Shamshi-Adad I (after a long siege) and afterward his son Ishme-Dagan. For its part Eshnunna received the "spoils" of the city. Then, after a brief period of independence under ruler Ardigandi it fell to the city of Kakmum under its ruler Gurgurrum. The primary sources of this knowledge are from the Stele of Dadusha, Stele of Shamshi-Adad (in the Louvre), texts from Mari, and texts from Shemshara.

See also
Cities of the ancient Near East
The archaeological hills in Erbil

References

Further reading
Jason Ur, "The Archaeological Renaissance in the Kurdistan Region of Iraq", Near Eastern Archaeology, vol. 80, no. 3, pp. 176–187, 2017
Kopanias, Konstantinos, John MacGinnis, and Jason Alik Ur., "Archaeological projects in the Kurdistan region in Iraq.", The Directorate of Antiquities of Kurdistan, pp. 1-52, 2015.

External links
Current excavation web site - Johns Hopkins University
Investigating a 2nd Mill. BC North Mesopotamian City: Kurd Qaburstan, Iraq (G. Schwartz)
Kurd Qaburstan Magnetometry by Andrew Creekmore - 2018

Archaeological sites in Iraq